This article is not about British diplomat Edward Thomas Rogers (1831–1884)

Thomas Edward Rogers CMG MBE (28 December 1912 – 26 November 1999) was a British diplomat.

Biography
Born on 28 December 1912, Thomas Rogers was educated at Bedford School and at Emmanuel College, Cambridge. He served in the Indian Civil Service  between 1936 and 1947, entering the British Diplomatic Service in 1948. He was British Ambassador to Colombia between 1970 and 1973.

In 1991, Rogers published his memoirs under the title Great Game, Grand Game: Memoirs of India, the Gulf & Diplomacy.

Rogers died on 26 November 1999.

References

1912 births
1999 deaths
People educated at Bedford School
Alumni of Emmanuel College, Cambridge
Ambassadors of the United Kingdom to Colombia
Members of HM Diplomatic Service
Companions of the Order of St Michael and St George
Members of the Order of the British Empire
20th-century British diplomats